This is a list of members of the Australian House of Representatives from 1983 to 1984, as elected at the 1983 federal election. They were together known as the 33rd Parliament.

 The Liberal member for Wannon (VIC), Malcolm Fraser, resigned on 31 March 1983; Liberal candidate David Hawker won the resulting by-election on 7 May 1983.
 The Liberal member for Bruce (VIC), Sir Billy Snedden, resigned on 21 April 1983; Liberal candidate Ken Aldred won the resulting by-election on 28 May 1983.
 The Liberal member for Moreton (Qld), Sir James Killen, resigned on 15 August 1983; Liberal candidate Don Cameron won the resulting by-election on 5 November 1983.
 The Labor member for Hughes (NSW), Les Johnson, resigned in January 1984; Labor candidate Robert Tickner won the resulting by-election on 18 February 1984.
 The Liberal member for Corangamite, Tony Street, resigned on 18 January 1984; Liberal candidate Stewart McArthur won the resulting by-election on 18 February 1984.
 The National member for Richmond (NSW), Doug Anthony, resigned on 18 January 1984; National candidate Charles Blunt won the resulting by-election on 18 February 1984.

References

Members of Australian parliaments by term
20th-century Australian politicians